First Interstate could refer to:
 First Interstate Bancorp, a former bank now a part of Wells Fargo
 First Interstate BancSystem, the current bank based in the upper American Mountain West
 Interstate 1, numerically the first interstate highway
 Pennsylvania Turnpike, one of three highways claimed to be the first interstate highway
 Missouri interstates 44 and 70, second of three states claiming first interstate highways 
 Interstate 44 in Missouri
 Interstate 70 in Missouri
 Interstate 70 in Kansas, claimed first paved in interstate highway system